TtyEmulator is a Freeware terminal emulator application which can act as a client for the SSH, Telnet, rlogin, and raw TCP computing protocols and as a serial console client.  
TtyEmulator is written for Microsoft Windows, but it will be ported to various other operating systems, if requested.
TtyEmulator was written and is maintained by FCS. Several release type can be fetched by the autoupdate feature. 
Users can use this software free of charge even for private companies.

Features

Global features
 Session manager included with two layouts (tree mode or folders).
 User defined Hotkey to access to the Sessions manager.
 Help file included [French only at the moment, English translation is in progress]
 URL registering for Windows
 Portable Edition : Enables user to store the software, configuration file, and even personal language file on an external storage (USB key, etc.)
 Users can edit configuration file, while using portable edition (Configuration file in XML format).
 Proxy support (Socks 4,4a,5, http, local) (proxy authentication also supported)
 Scripting (with special escape characters support)
 Auto-update feature.
 Global and/or session specific Contextual commands.
 SSH bouncing management (Enables users to connect to a first ssh server and then automatically make a second connection to another ssh server).
 Display detailed information about established SSH communications.
 zlib compression support
 Several languages support (French and English included by default), Users can make language file in order to adapt this software to their natural language.
 Specifics commands support for :
 SSH (Ssh bouncing specific commands included)
 Telnet
 Serial communication
 Predefined display (80x25, 132x50, fullscreen, etc.)
 X11 server automatic launching at session startup.
 FileZilla or WinSCP interfacing

Session specific features
 Eye-candy display features (customized background, font, size, etc.)
 Own clipboard with eight entries.
 Session scroll locking.
 Enables users to easily create Windows shortcuts for sessions.
 Customized buffer size.
 User defined session icon.

Bundled Applications 
Main functions are realized by TtyEmulator files themselves:
  - the Telnet and SSH, serial, tcp-raw, and udpserver itself;
  - The SSH agent can also emulate Pagent (the PuTTY Ssh agent);
  - A TFTP client is included.

See also 
 Comparison of SSH clients
 SecureCRT
 PuTTY
 Cygwin/X
 WinSCP
 FileZilla
 Xming

References

External links
 Home page
 TtyEmulator's direct download link

Cryptographic software
Portable software
Freeware
Internet Protocol based network software